Mario-Ernesto Rodríguez Berutti (born 4 September 1976 in Montevideo) is a Uruguayan-born former Italian footballer.

At the age of 19, Rodríguez moved from C.A. Progreso in his native Uruguay to Germany to join the Regionalliga Nord side Kickers Emden. He spent a year in the Dutch Eredivisie with FC Groningen, making 28 appearances, and later played one game for the Stuttgarter Kickers in the 2. Fußball-Bundesliga. He spent the rest of his footballing career in the lower German Oberliga and retired from the sport in 2008.

Rodríguez now lives with his family on Majorca where he is a hotelier.

References

External links 
 
 

1976 births
Living people
Footballers from Montevideo
Uruguayan footballers
Uruguayan emigrants to Italy
Association football defenders
Eredivisie players
2. Bundesliga players
Club Nacional de Football players
C.A. Progreso players
FC Groningen players
Stuttgarter Kickers players
Tennis Borussia Berlin players
Uruguayan expatriate footballers
Expatriate footballers in Germany
Expatriate footballers in the Netherlands